Benjamin Ngaruiya (born 8 May 1968) is a Kenyan boxer. He competed in the men's bantamweight event at the 1992 Summer Olympics.

References

External links
 

1968 births
Living people
Kenyan male boxers
Olympic boxers of Kenya
Boxers at the 1992 Summer Olympics
Place of birth missing (living people)
Bantamweight boxers